Tha Phra railway station is a railway station located in Tha Phra Subdistrict, Mueang Khon Kaen District, Khon Kaen Province. The station was rebuilt  in 2019 as part of the double tracking project between Thanon Chira Junction and Khon Kaen.

References 

Railway stations in Thailand
Khon Kaen province